Iragi (Dargwa: Ирагъи) is a rural locality (a selo) in Kudaginsky Selsoviet, Dakhadayevsky District, Republic of Dagestan, Russia. The population was 843 as of 2010. There are 7 streets.

Geography
Iragi is located 17 km southeast of Urkarakh (the district's administrative centre) by road. Kudagu and Trisanchi are the nearest rural localities.

Nationalities 
Dargins live there.

References 

Rural localities in Dakhadayevsky District